Sumant Jayakrishnan is a contemporary Indian set designer, lighting designer and costume designer. He also designs exhibitions. He was trained in NID ( National Institute of Design ) in Ahmedabad.

Recent works 
 A midsummer night's dream (2006) Play directed by Tim Supple, Set and costume design
 Paperdoll (2005) Choreography by Padmini Chettur, Set and lighting design
 Water (2005) Movie directed by Deepa Mehta, Art Direction

External links
Website of "Midsummer night's dream"
Celebrating Creativity: Life : Work of Uday Shankar
Filmography at NY Times
Eyebeam
 

Year of birth missing (living people)
Living people
Indian costume designers
Lighting designers